Eddie Powell (9 March 1927 - 11 August 2000) was a British stuntman and actor.

Powell performed stuntwork in several films for Hammer Studios, serving as a regular stunt double for Christopher Lee. His credits during this time included portraying Thompson in Daleks' Invasion Earth 2150 A.D. (1966) and the Mummy in The Mummy's Shroud (1967). He also appeared in several James Bond films.

Powell portrayed the Aliens for stuntwork in Alien (1979) and Aliens (1986). He also did stunts in Indiana Jones and the Last Crusade (1989), Batman (1989), and Robin Hood: Prince of Thieves (1991). He had an uncredited part as The Goat of Mendes in The Devil Rides Out (1968).

Personal life
He was married to Hammer's wardrobe-mistress Rosemary Burrows, and was the brother of Joe Powell, also a film stuntman.

Death
Powell died on 11 August 2000 at Berkshire, England, UK the age of 73 caused complications by heart failure

Filmography

External links
 

1927 births
2000 deaths
Male actors from London
British male television actors
English stunt performers